The Washington Times is a current American daily newspaper in Washington D.C. founded in 1982.

Washington Times may also refer to:

Washington Times-Herald (Indiana) (1867-present), an American daily newspaper serving Washington, Indiana, and adjacent portions of Daviess County, Indiana. It is owned by Community Newspaper Holdings Inc.
The Washington Times (1894–1939) was an American daily newspaper published in Washington, D.C.. It was founded in 1894 and merged with the Washington Herald to create the Washington Times-Herald in 1939.
Washington Times-Herald (1939–1954) was an American daily newspaper published in Washington, D.C.